Inspired by the biological classification system of the Linnaean taxonomy, screenwriter Eric R. Williams developed the Screenwriters Taxonomy in 2017 to create a common language of creative collaboration for filmmakers.  Williams’ central thesis in The Screenwriters Taxonomy: A Roadmap to Collaborative Storytelling is that the term “genre” is used so broadly to describe films that the modern use of the word has become meaningless.  The Screenwriter's Taxonomy proposes seven categories for discussing the creative process of telling cinematic stories.

 Type 
 Super Genre 
 Macrogenres 
 Microgenres 
 Voice 
 Pathway 
 Point of View

Type 
In the broadest sense, Williams contends that all narrative fiction films can be broken down into two types: Comedy or Drama.  The difference between these types is simply based on whether or not the film is more serious (drama) or humorous (comedy).  There are ten different brands of drama, and a dozen brands of comedy.

Super Genre 
Williams argues that there are only eleven true genres, which he calls “Super Genres”.   Super genres are defined by three elements (each consisting of specific components):

 Character (consisting of the types of central characters, those characters’ goals, and stock characters that support the story)
 Story (consisting of central themes, the rhythm of how the story is told and the classic tent pole scenes that the audience expects)
 Atmosphere (consisting of locations, costumes, props and visceral experiences for the audience)

According to Williams, the eleven super genres are:

 Action
 Crime
 Fantasy
 Horror
 Life
 Romance        
 Science Fiction
 Sports
 Thriller
 War
 Western

The super genre “Life” is further divided into

 Day in the Life (where the main character's daily struggles are the central conflict in the story)
 Slice of Life (stories focused on how community copes with every day issues).

Macro Genres 

While there are a limited number of super genres, there are at least fifty macro genres.  A macro genre contains interchangeable elements that pair with super genres to create a more detailed story.  By pairing a macro genre with a super genre, more specific expectations emerge within a story.  For example, “Time Travel” is a macro genre.  It can be paired with a variety of super genres to create a time travel fantasy story, or a time travel romance.  Multiple macro genres can be used for a single story.  The fifty macro genres identified by Williams are (although he contends that there are probably more):

An example of how the “mystery” macro genre would pair with each super genre:

 Reservoir Dogs is an action mystery 
 The Usual Suspects is a crime mystery         
 Who Framed Roger Rabbit is a fantasy mystery
 The Blair Witch Project is a horror mystery
 The Hangover is a slice of life mystery
 Vertigo is a romance mystery
 Minority Report is a science fiction mystery
 Eight Men Out is a sports mystery
 The Silence of the Lambs is a thriller mystery
 The Manchurian Candidate is a war mystery
 The Hateful Eight is a western mystery

Micro Genres 

Macro genres can be paired randomly with any given super genre.  Micro genres work differently.  Each micro genre is particular to a given macro genre – providing even more specificity and nuance to the story, characters and atmosphere.  Therefore, each macro genre has its own set of possible micro genres.  For example, the “biography” macro genre has at least six possible micro genres:

 Biography of the rich and/or famous (The Social Network or Malcolm X)
 Biography of an entertainer or athlete (Ray or Cinderella Man)
 Biography of a politician (The King's Speech)
 Biography of an unknown person doing something remarkable (Schindler's List)
 Biography of a group or organization (Remember the Titans)
 Biography of a newsworthy or historical event (Apollo 13 or The Imitation Game)

The micro genres for each macro are as follows:

Voice 
“Voice” does not address the genre traits of story, characters and atmosphere.  Instead, voice concentrates on how the story is told.  A traditional Hollywood story is told:

 as a linear narrative
 made using modern filmmaking techniques
 written for a broad audience
 with live-action, human characters
 that speak their dialogue
 as oblivious participants in the screenwriter's story.

According to the Screenwriters Taxonomy, within this definition of how a Hollywood story is told, six questions can influence the screenwriter's voice:

1.  Will the story be told linearly, or will there be an alternative voice that uses:

 Flashbacks (e.g.: Slumdog Millionaire)
 Intercut time periods (e.g.: The Hours)
 Parallel realities (e.g.: Atonement)
 Repetition (e.g.: Groundhog Day)
 Time travel (e.g.: 12 Monkeys)
 Reverse chronology (e.g.: Memento)

2.  Should the filmmaker expect to use modern filmmaking techniques, or will there be an alternative voice such as using:

 Black and white film (e.g.: Raging Bull)
 Silent film techniques (e.g.: Gravity)
 Longer takes (e.g.: Gerry)
 Few camera moves (e.g.: The New World)

3.  Is the story being written for a broad audience, or will there be an alternative audience addressed with this voice, for example:

 Adult audience (e.g.: 9 ½ Weeks)
 Child audience (e.g.: Clifford the Big Red Dog)
 LGBTQ audience (e.g.: Blue is the Warmest Colour)
 Minority audience (e.g.: Barber Shop)
 Female audience (e.g.: Little Women)
 Religious audience (e.g.: Killing Jesus)

4.  Will the story be presented with live action, human actors or will there be an alternative voice that uses techniques such as:

 Stop Motion Animation (e.g.: Fantastic Mr. Fox)
 Live Action Puppets (e.g.: The Muppet Movie)
 2D or 3D Animation (e.g.: Big Hero 6)

5.  Will the characters speak their dialogue, or will there be a different approach to communicating, for instance:

 Musicals (e.g.: Hamilton)
 Silence (e.g.: The Artist)
 Voice Over (e.g.: Goodfellas)

6.  Are the fictional characters oblivious that a film is being made, or will there be an alternative technique in play, for example:

 Breaking the fourth wall (e.g.: Fight Club)
 Mock-u-mentary approach (e.g.: Borat)
 Internal Monologues (e.g.: A Clockwork Orange)

Pathway 
Pathways describe the trajectory of how the audience will move through the story.  Regardless of genre, each story sends their protagonist(s) along a specific trajectory (or pathway).   The pathway becomes a subconscious roadmap for the audience – a tool to guide them through the story.   There are twenty different pathways, including the traditional pathway with which American audiences are most familiar. The traditional pathway has five elements:

 A single protagonist goes through a change.
 The audience and protagonist generally learn information at the same time.
 The protagonist follows the Hero's Journey.
 The central pay-off for the audience is the protagonist battling an antagonist character.
 In the end, our hero is victorious and is rewarded.

These five elements take an audience through a film in a familiar way. As an example, in the 1991 Academy Award Winning film Silence of the Lambs, the audience joins Clarice Starling on her metamorphosis from fledgling to experienced FBI agent.  They go through the story with her. What she learns, they learn.  She starts in the world of law enforcement, makes her way into the world of the criminally insane, and eventually returns, victorious, to her home at the FBI. The visceral pay-off for the audience comes from her mental battle with Dr. Lecter and Buffalo Bill.  In the end, Agent Starling is rewarded for the battle that she waged.

In addition to the traditional pathway, there are nineteen others:

These nineteen pathways diverge from the traditional pathway in one of seven ways:

#1: Defeated Underdog 
The protagonist may battle an antagonist, but the more important struggle is often against some larger force. The audience's enjoyment comes from watching this larger force destroy the protagonist.  In this pathway, the protagonist is typically destroyed.  Or, if he survives, the survival itself is the victory. Rarely does the protagonist “come out on top”.

Pathways in this category:

 Noir
 Tale of Madness
 Rags to Riches to Rags

#2: Defeated Underdog + Subverted Journeys 
The protagonist may confront an antagonist, but the central focus is watching the protagonist endure an extreme personal tragedy.  The protagonist is often destroyed emotionally, and rarely “comes out on top”.  Additionally, in this pathway, the hero's attention to personal tragedy diverts them from their original heroic journey.

Pathway in this category:

 Melodrama

#3: Subverted Journeys 
The protagonist rarely returns home – literally or metaphorically.

Pathways in this category:

 Chase/Hunt
 Road Movie

#4: Multiple Protagonists 
These Pathways to not use a single protagonist to carry the story.  Instead, they split the story equally across multiple protagonists. Each story is shorter because each character has a full story with their own beginning, middle and end.  Protagonists may or may not confront an antagonist.  If they do, the antagonist is often a broad, two-dimensional character. The audience is more engaged in the emotional relationship between the various protagonists than they are in external conflicts.

Pathways in this category:

 Buddy Movie
 Screwball Comedy
 Reuniting the Gang
 Unlikely Ensemble

#5: Multiple Protagonists + Unknowing Audience 
These pathways do not use a single protagonist to carry the story.  Instead, they split the story equally across multiple protagonists.  Protagonists may or may not confront a specific antagonist.  Often the story revolves around an event that the group must endure, or a mission that the group must accomplish.  Each character serves as the antagonist in their colleague's story.  What sets this pathway apart from the simple “Multi-Protagonist” pathway is how the backstory is provided to the audience. In this pathway, the audience is perpetually playing “catch up”.  The protagonists know each other, and have known each other for some time.  However, the audience joins the characters’ story already in progress.

Pathways in this category:

 Reunion Films
 Gang Falls Apart

#6: All-Knowing Audience 
In these pathways, the audience knows more than the protagonist. The audience doesn't learn information as much as they remember information.  Enjoyment comes from reminiscence, and the central pay-off comes from watching the protagonist go through an awakening, not from battling a powerful antagonist.  

Pathways in this category:

 Coming of Age
 Lost Innocence

#7: Non-Character Antagonists 
In most stories, the protagonist battles an antagonist: another flesh-and-blood sentient being. These pathways diverge from this expectation by telling stories of a protagonist's battle against something non-sentient. These are stories of circumstance, where the “antagonist” does not set out to willfully engage and destroy the protagonist. Yet, the protagonist's life or livelihood is in danger, nonetheless.

Pathways in this category:

 Fish Out of Water
 Human vs. Nature
 Human vs. Self
 Human vs. Society
 Human vs. Technology

Point of View 
From the outset of any story, the screenwriter must decide how much information the audience will have.  Point of View (POV) as a decision tree with three central questions.

 Will the storyteller limit what the audience can see, or will storyteller allow them to be omniscient?
 Will the story be told from a primary or secondary character's perspective?
 Is this story being told objectively, or is there a subjective element to the events?

By finding the answers that best help to tell their story, screenwriters determine a POV for their screenplay.  The Screenwriters Taxonomy boils the answers to these questions down into the five most common POVs:

Filmmaker Omniscient 
The characters are unaware that a film is being made, and so have no narrative voice.  Instead, the filmmaker crafts a story by taking us on an omniscient tour of characters and events, designed to intrigue and entertain the audience by showing the perfect piece of the story at the most impactful time. This type of filmmaking is almost always objective, since the very nature of watching a movie is predicated on the filmmaking being truthful.

Primary Omniscient 
The story is viewed through the main character's perspective. The story is often biased, and the actions told in retrospect – in order to tell the “bigger story” in which the primary character has been caught.  Alan Ball used this technique in his final draft of American Beauty.

Primary Limited 
A greater sense of objectivity is created when the protagonist's POV is limited. Although the story is told from a single person's subjective interpretation of events, this POV may seem more authentic and objective in certain situation.

Secondary Limited 
Secondary limited is unusual, but not out of the question.  In fact, some of the most famous stories of all time – like the tales of Sherlock Holmes – are told from a secondary, limited perspective.  Of course, the story is about the primary character (Sherlock Holmes), but it is told from the perspective of a secondary character (Dr. Watson).  Sir Arthur Conan Doyle, as the author, reveals only what Watson would logically know or be able to infer about how Sherlock Holmes solved the crime.

Secondary Omniscient 
Secondary omniscient is even more unusual, and typically occurs when the character is reflecting back on her life or has some sort of special power that causes omniscience.  The Coen Brothers used this POV in No Country for Old Men, with sheriff Bell reflecting back on a particular case.

Case Studies 

As with the Linnaean taxonomy, Williams claims that each “narrative Hollywood film” utilizes each category: type, super genre, macro genre, micro genre, voice, pathway, and point of view.  Each category further defines the film and allows for more specific discussion, analysis and/or creative decision making.

An example of eight films and their categorization according to the Screenwriters Taxonomy:

References

Screenwriting